Odontoscelis is a genus of true bugs belonging to the family Scutelleridae.

The species of this genus are found in Europe.

Species:
 Odontoscelis byrrhus Seidenstucker, 1972 
 Odontoscelis fuliginosa (Linnaeus, 1761)

References

Scutelleridae